The Black Hamptons is an American drama miniseries created by Carl Weber. It premiered on BET+ on August 25, 2022.

Plot

Cast and characters
Lamman Rucker as Anthony Johnson
Vanessa Bell Calloway as Carolyn Britton
Elise Neal as Sydney Johnson
Brian J. White as Jeffery Bowen
Karon Riley as Malcom Britton
Mike Merrill as Martin Britton
Blac Chyna as Karrin
Aaron D. Spears as Sergeant Lane
Daya Vaidya as Vanessa Britton
Cameo Sherrell as Leslie Bowen
Franklin Ojeda Smith as Rev. Chauncey Taylor
Jordan Austin Smith as Jesse Britton
Jennifer Freeman as Kimberly
David Andrews as Peter Lane

Episodes

Production

Development
The series was picked up by BET on March 10, 2022. On May 25, 2022, the series moved to BET+. The series premiered on August 25, 2022.

Casting
The main cast was revealed on March 10, 2022.

References

External links

2020s American black television series
2020s American drama television series
2022 American television series debuts
2022 American television series endings
BET+ original programming
English-language television shows